Michael "Jakko" Jakszyk (born Michael Lee Curran, 8 June 1958) is an English musician, record producer, and actor. He has released several solo albums as a singer, songwriter, and multi-instrumentalist. He is best known as lead singer and second guitarist of King Crimson between 2013 and 2021 succeeding Adrian Belew in the role. His work has been variously credited to "Jakko", "Jakko Jakszyk", and "Jakko M. Jakszyk".

Before joining King Crimson, he led bands for over thirty years, including 64 Spoons, Dizrhythmia, 21st Century Schizoid Band, Jakszyk Fripp Collins, and Rapid Eye Movement. He was a member of Level 42, the Lodge, and the Tangent and has collaborated with Tom Robinson, Peter Blegvad, Danny Thompson, Gavin Harrison, Warren Harry, Pandit Dinesh, and Dave Stewart. Jakszyk has also worked as a session musician and soundtrack producer.

Biography

Roots and childhood (1958–1974)
Jakszyk was born at Whittington Hospital in Archway, London, the son of Irish singer Peggy Curran and an unknown American airman. At 18 months of age, he was adopted by two European refugees who had settled in England after World War II: Polish Norbert Jakszyk and his French wife, Camille. Jakszyk grew up in Croxley Green, Hertfordshire, and would later describe his childhood as unhappy; his adoptive parents' nationalities led to an unsettled home life. He explained, "There was a lot of confusion – English was [a] second language for both of them, so although I could understand them both, they often couldn't understand each other – it led to all sorts of daft misunderstandings and rows." Jakszyk was frequently in conflict with Norbert, although the two would reconcile later in life. In 1977, he tracked down his birth mother Peggy, who had settled in Arkansas; he and Peggy would eventually meet in 1984. Jakszyk would later reconstruct his complex family history in an extended radio piece, The Road to Ballina.

Originally aiming to become a professional footballer, Jakszyk switched his full attention to his other two obsessions, music and acting, after failing to win a place with the Watford Boys football squad at the age of 15. As a developing musician, he was inspired equally by pop, progressive rock, and jazz fusion (with artists such as Allan Holdsworth, Henry Cow, King Crimson, and Hatfield and the North being particular favourites) and developed a high level of skill as both a guitarist and singer by his mid-teens. Having joined the National Youth Theatre at 14, he maintained his acting work in parallel to his musical efforts and would eventually gain his Equity card. In 1974, at the age of 16, he was kicked out of the Jakszyk family home by Norbert, and embarked on a struggling career as part-time actor and musician while working at a number of dead-end jobs to survive financially.

Early bands: Soon After, 64 Spoons, and Rapid Eye Movement (1975–1980)
By 1975, Jakszyk was leading an eccentric jazz-rock band called Soon After. His self-confessed "dictatorial tendencies" reduced a bigger line-up to a trio of "two screaming lead guitars and a trumpet" (the latter played by ex-National Youth Jazz Orchestra member Ted Emmett). The band reached the finals of the 1975 Melody Maker National Rock/Folk competition, finishing third. When Soon After split up, Jakszyk toured with "a strange little band" which supported Camel, Stackridge, and Judas Priest, then briefly joined a Tring-based band called Synthesis which played progressive rock in the Canterbury-scene vein.

Jakszyk's first significant band was 64 Spoons, which he joined as guitarist and lead singer in 1976, co-writing much of the band's material. Between 1976 and 1980, 64 Spoons wrote and performed a blend of pop, progressive rock, jazz, and comedy (typified by their single "Ladies Don't Have Willies"). Boosted by an exuberant and funny live show, 64 Spoons proved popular with audiences but failed to gain an effective record deal or media breakthrough and split up in 1980. Their only album, Landing on a Rat Column, was eventually released in 1992, many years after it was recorded. Jakszyk would  describe them as "the wrong band at the wrong time".

64 Spoons's work did, however, lead to friendships with several of the musicians who had inspired the band, notably keyboard player Dave Stewart. Following the split of 64 Spoons, Jakszyk joined Stewart, Rick Biddulph, and Pip Pyle in the band Rapid Eye Movement. Jakszyk contributed several songs to the band's repertoire ("One More Time", "I'll Stand On My Own", "Ingmar Bergman on the Window Sill", "Straining Our Eyes", and "Dear Clare", the last of these a 64 Spoons song) and co-wrote material with Stewart ("This Is Not What I Want" and "'Allo Darlin' I Work on the Fair"). Between August 1980 and June 1981, Rapid Eye Movement toured Spain, France, and the UK and recorded material but split up due to Stewart's desire to concentrate on studio work (Jakszyk sang on the original version of Stewart's cover of "What Becomes of the Brokenhearted?", later a hit with a new vocal track by the Zombies' lead singer Colin Blunstone).

During this period, Jakszyk also contributed to sessions for the former Van der Graaf Generator saxophonist David Jackson's album The Long Hello Vol. 3 (eventually released in 1982).

Early solo career, Stewart/Gaskin, and the Lodge (1981–1987)
Signing a solo deal with Chiswick Records in 1981, Jakszyk began to record his debut solo album, Silesia, aided by Dave Stewart, David Jackson, and Amanda Parsons. During 1982, Chiswick released three singles ("The Night Has a Thousand Eyes", "Straining Our Eyes", and "Grab What You Can"), although none were hits. A full release of Silesia was shelved at the last minute while the album was at the manufacturing stage (although the album had a limited release in Germany). Strengthening his existing links to British art rock, Jakszyk began working with Peter Blegvad and would go on to play on the latter's first three solo albums (beginning with 1983's The Naked Shakespeare).

In 1983, Jakszyk signed a second solo recording contract with Stiff Records. Three further singles followed between 1983 and 1984 ("Dangerous Dreams", "I Can't Stand This Pressure", and "Who's Fooling Who") and recordings were made for a second solo album. Due for release in 1985, this album met the same fate as Silesia. It was shelved in 1985 when Stiff Records filed for bankruptcy.

Discouraged but not defeated, Jakko supplemented his income with acting work while continuing to pursue music. He continued his collaboration with Dave Stewart, contributing to his duo work with Barbara Gaskin and playing a prominent role on the Stewart-produced Neil's Heavy Concept Album (a 1984 spin-off from the Young Ones comedy series). During this time he also met an up-and-coming drummer named Gavin Harrison, who would become one of his most frequent collaborators. It was also during this time that he finally visited the United States to meet his birth mother.

Jakszyk's third attempt at recording a solo album, this time for MDM Records in 1986–87, was shelved when MDM's distributor, Virgin Records, dropped its support. Some of the "lost" material from this and the previously shelved albums resurfaced on Jakszyk's 1996 compilation album Are My Ears on Wrong?, while Jakko's ill-fated first album Silesia was briefly issued on CD in the late 1990s.

In 1987, Jakszyk joined Peter and Kristoffer Blegvad, John Greaves, and Anton Fier in the short-lived New York-based band the Lodge, with whom he recorded one album, The Smell of a Friend.

Session musician/producer, the Kings of Oblivion, and Dizrhythmia (1987–1989)
From 1987 onwards, Jakszyk consolidated his work as a pop session player and budding producer, and also signed a new and remunerative publishing deal. He worked with producer Larry Williams in Los Angeles, during which he wrote with, produced or played for Bill Myers, Shari Belafonte, and Tommy Funderburk's rock band What If. This period was also notable for a ludicrous footwear-related encounter with Michael Jackson and for Jakszyk's refusal to let Whitney Houston record one of his songs (either "Behave Yourself" and "Don't Blame Me", both of which were later recorded by the Nolans). Returning to the UK, he played with Swing Out Sister and Sam Brown, contributing to and co-arranging the latter's 1988 hit single "Stop", and toured with Italian singer Alice.

He formed the Kings of Oblivion with Gavin Harrison in order to record the album Big Fish Popcorn, which was released on the Bam Caruso label in 1987. The album was a pastiche project similar to XTC's the Dukes of Stratosphear that was later described  as "inspiring" and "the absolute worst of Frank Zappa or Ween". Both musicians took on ridiculous pseudonyms for the project (Jakszyk as "Mario 'Fat Man' Vanzetti" and Harrison as "Helmo 'Hairdo' Hudson") and fictitious liner notes claimed that the recordings were the first and second sides of a "lost" 1967 double LP recorded in the back of an auto shop.

The Kings of Oblivion led into a more serious project when Jakszyk and Harrison teamed up with classical Indian singer/percussionist Pandit Dinesh and Danny Thompson on double bass. The quartet formed the world-fusion project Dizrhythmia, which mixed jazz, folk, art rock, and Indian classical music. Pandit Dinesh encouraged Sultan Khan to contribute to the album, while his three British colleagues brought in their own friends and colleagues from the art rock world: Dave Stewart, pedal steel guitarist B. J. Cole, and Lyndon Connah from  64 Spoons. Dizrhythmia's self-titled album was released in 1988 by Antilles Records.

Tom Robinson, Level 42, and the Kinks (1990–1994)
In 1988, Jakszyk began recording a duo album with Tom Robinson called We Never Had It So Good: it was released in 1990 and gained positive press attention. This brought Jakszyk to the attention of Jazz-funk band Level 42, who needed to replace their recently deceased guitarist Alan Murphy and Murphy's temporary substitute, Allan Holdsworth. Jakszyk's  Holdsworthian guitar style, additional instrumental skills, and broad knowledge of pop music made him a natural choice.

Jakszyk went on to play on all of Level 42's tours and promotional appearances between 1991 and 1994. However, record company politics restricted his contributions: despite being pictured on the cover of 1991's Guaranteed, he never performed on a Level 42 studio album and was never a full member of the band. For similar reasons, material which he wrote and recorded with the band with the intention of release ended up shelved when Level 42 reunited with drummer and songwriter Phil Gould. Gould's second period with the band was short, and Jakszyk brought in Gavin Harrison as drummer to fulfil tour obligations. Jakszyk left Level 42 in 1994 when group leaders Mark King and Mike Lindup opted to split the band up. He would later play in one of the line-ups of King's solo bands.

During 1994, Jakszyk was very briefly a member of the Kinks. He performed with them  on 1 January 1994 BBC Radio broadcast of The Johnnie Walker Show, substituting for estranged guitarist Dave Davies. The songs performed on the broadcast were "Phobia", "Over the Edge", "Wall of Fire" and "Till the End of the Day #2".

Solo artist, art rock journeyman, and radio documentarian (1994–1999)
Following Level 42's disbandment, Jakszyk joined three former members of Japan – Richard Barbieri, Mick Karn and Steve Jansen – who were considering forming another band following the disintegration of their post-Japan project Rain Tree Crow and the end of their work in the No-Man live band. The musical combination of the four players worked well and led to a lasting musical friendship, but did not result in a full-time band project. Instead, Jakko resumed his solo career. Signing a new record deal with the progressive/art rock label Resurgence, he released the Kingdom of Dust EP in 1994. All four of the EP tracks came from his work with Jansen, Barbieri, and Karn.

In 1995, Jakszyk released a solo album, Mustard Gas and Roses, on Resurgence, featuring a mixture of sharp, intelligent pop songs and progressive/art rock instrumentals. The album featured further contributions from Karn and Jansen, as well as from Sam Brown, BJ Cole and Jakko's Dizrhythmia colleagues Danny Thompson and Gavin Harrison. In 1996, Resurgence released a Jakko compilation album called Are My Ears on Wrong? – which compiled material from Jakko's second and third solo albums (the ones which had been shelved by Stiff and MDM during the mid -1980s).

Since 1991, Jakszyk had been sketching out plans for an autobiographical radio piece called The Road to Ballina, a mixed music-and-spoken word project exploring his own family history and his bittersweet search for his birth mother. In 1995 this went into production. In addition to Jakszyk's own account of growing up as an adoptee, the work included extensive contributions from both of his adoptive parents relating to their often harrowing wartime experience in Europe as refugees and conscripts and as people under occupation. Several of the recordings were conceptually arranged (including specially made recordings of Norbert Jakszyk recorded in Auschwitz-Birkenau) while the music tracks featured Gavin Harrison and two of Jakszyk's former Level 42 colleagues, Mark King and Gary Barnacle.

The Road to Ballina was broadcast on BBC Radio 3 in December 1996, and Resurgence released a shorter and compressed version on CD in early 1997. This was the first of Jakszyk's albums to be credited to "Jakko M. Jakszyk", and he would release all of his future solo work under that name.

In March 1999, BBC Radio 3 broadcast a second Jakko radio piece called The Church of Lanza, which used many of the same techniques as The Road to Ballina. The piece dealt with the nature of fame and celebrity, focussing on "the deification of stars who die young", and used the life of Mario Lanza as its focal point. The piece incurred the wrath of a number of outraged Mario Lanza fans and, unlike The Road to Ballina, was not released on album.

During this period, Jakszyk continued to work as a guest and collaborator. Between 1994 and 1999 he contributed to albums by Akiko Kobayashi (Under the Monkey Puzzle Tree), Peter Blegvad (Just Woke Up), Gavin Harrison (Sanity & Gravity), Pip Pyle (7 Year Itch), Saro Cosentino (Ones and Zeros), and Richard Barbieri (Indigo Falls).

A particularly notable Jakko guest effort was his contribution to Mick Karn's 1996 album The Tooth Mother. While providing guitar, keyboards and flute, he also played saxophone, shawm and the Indian bowed dilruba.

21st Century Schizoid Band, The Bruised Romantic Glee Club, and the Tangent (2000–2009) 
In 2002, Jakszyk was instrumental in the establishment of the 21st Century Schizoid Band, which specialised in performing the 1960s and 1970s repertoire of King Crimson and featured several ex-members/associates of the band – Ian McDonald, Mel Collins, Peter Giles and Michael Giles (the last later replaced by Ian Wallace). Jakszyk led the band, playing guitar and singing. Over a five-year period, the 21st Century Schizoid Band played occasional tours in the UK, North America and Japan. The band was well received by audiences, and released several live albums plus a concert DVD. Its work came to a halt in 2005 due to lack of funding and difficulties in finding worthwhile arrangements for tours: Wallace's death in 2007 finally put an end to the project.

By this point, Jakszyk had spent several years assembling another solo album, which was eventually released as The Bruised Romantic Glee Club in 2006. Hailed as his most accomplished work to date, the double album featured one disc of new Jakszyk songs and one disc of his reinterpretations of works by musicians who'd influenced him (including King Crimson, Soft Machine and Henry Cow). The album included a remarkable sweep of guest performers assembled from the full length of Jakszyk's career and associations. As well as contributions from long-standing allies Lyndon Connah, Gavin Harrison and Dave Stewart, the guests included Danny Thompson and Pandit Dinesh (from Dizrhythmia); Mark and Nathan King (from Level 42); and King Crimson members Robert Fripp, Mel Collins and Ian Wallace. Hugh Hopper (Soft Machine) and Clive Brooks (Egg) also made an appearance, playing on a Soft Machine cover version initially recorded for a compilation in 2000.

Despite some highly complimentary reviews, the original 2006 release of The Bruised Romantic Glee Club was blighted by bad luck and the collapse of the record company releasing it. Eventually, the album was re-released on the King Crimson-associated record label Panegyric in 2009 (alongside a companion album of material recorded at the same time called Waves Sweep the Sand).

In 2007, Jakszyk joined British progressive rock band the Tangent for their album Not as Good as the Book (released 2008). Following one guest appearance and one full live show at the Summers End festival in September 2008, he resigned from the band.

King Crimson (2010–present)
Since 2002, Jakszyk's connections to the musicians in and around King Crimson had grown closer (via the 21st Century Schizoid Band, Gavin Harrison's recruitment into King Crimson in 2007, and Jakszyk's own developing friendship with Robert Fripp, which led to Jakszyk being invited to remix King Crimson's 1995 album Thrak for reissue) . In January 2010, Jakszyk and Fripp began recording ambient instrumental pieces on a casual basis: this eventually developed into a full song-based project involving Mel Collins. Gavin Harrison and King Crimson bass player Tony Levin were brought in to complete the recordings, which were released in May 2011 on the Panegyric label as an album called A Scarcity of Miracles credited to Jakszyk Fripp & Collins. At the time, King Crimson was in a "dormant" phase, but the involvement of three current band members, one former band member and a previously separate singer-songwriter in this new project led to speculation that King Crimson was about to reactivate and would recruit Jakszyk as a new frontman.

Initially Fripp downplayed these suggestions. In an online diary entry, he described the trio as an endeavour which "has the Crimson gene, but is not quite KC. It is a Crimson ProjeKct, although this was not the intention. Given the gene pool, I suppose this counts as evolution. If JFC were named as a ProjeKct, which would be legitimate IMO, then all manner of expectations, categorisations, limitations & dopey commentaries would be launched to deter the ears of innocent audients". Fripp went on to comment that the origin of the trio was in fact a proposed but abandoned ProjeKct Seven (featuring himself, Jakszyk, Collins, Levin, Harrison and possibly some other players) and described the forthcoming A Scarcity of Miracles as "one of my favouritist  albums, of those where I am a determining element". A Scarcity of Miracles was met with a good critical response and a mixed welcome from the King Crimson fanbase. Due to Fripp's retirement from live performance, the release was not supported by a concert tour. Fripp's formal retirement from the music industry in 2012 stifled most of the remaining rumours.

On 24 September 2013, Fripp made the announcement that he was launching a new lineup of King Crimson, with its first tour planned for September 2014. Shortly afterwards the personnel list was announced, with Jakszyk confirmed as lead singer and second guitarist. The new King Crimson lineup continued and expanded the Scarcity of Miracles project personnel: other members besides Fripp and Jakszyk were Mel Collins, three members from the 2009 Crimson band (Gavin Harrison, Tony Levin and Pat Mastelotto) and another new recruit, American drummer/keyboard player Bill Rieflin (with a second drummer/keyboard player, Jeremy Stacey, also being added to the band in 2016). Jakko has remained with King Crimson until the present day as a key part of the band's longest continual lineup.

in September Jakko was awarded the 'Chris Squire Virtuoso award' at the 2017 Progressive Music Awards at Shakespeare's Globe in London. It was presented to him by comedian and actor Ade Edmondson.

Secrets & Lies Album (2020) 
On August 14, 2020 Jakko released an animated video for his single "The Trouble with Angels" directed by Iranian filmmaker, Sam Chegini. The song is taken from his latest album "Secrets & Lies", released on CD/DVD via InsideOut Music on the 23rd of October, 2020.

Work in comedy and acting
Jakszyk has had a sideline in comedy work parallel to his solo career (ranging from radio programmes to character work on television) and has spent some time as a member of the actor's union Equity. His work as a character comedian has included playing the demented but fleet-fingered Italian guitarist Eduardo, a sidekick to comedy music duo Raw Sex (Simon Brint and Rowland Rivron). As Eduardo, Jakszyk appeared on the French & Saunders TV show in 1987, as well as being part of Raw Sex's subsequent theatre show at the Kings Head in Islington and three-week stint at the Edinburgh Fringe Festival. Jakszyk also impersonated Lindsey Buckingham in the French & Saunders TV parody of Fleetwood Mac.

In the BBC TV movie In Dreams (starring Lenny Henry and Bill Paterson), Jakszyk makes a cameo appearance as Michael Jackson's recording engineer. He has also appeared in the BBC sitcom Birds Of A Feather.

Under the pseudonym of "Grand Master Jellytot", Jakszyk produced the novelty hip-hop single "The Stutter Rap" (performed by "Morris Minor and the Majors", who included future comic star Tony Hawks). This record was a sizeable chart hit in 1987.

Musical style
Jakszyk has followed a variety of musical approaches. He has become known – in his solo work in particular – for blending elements of pop with aspects of progressive rock. While known as a guitarist and singer, he also performs on a variety of keyboard, string and wind instruments from various cultures (and can write for even more), and his work has drawn on assorted elements of jazz, art rock, classical, Irish, Eastern European, Indian and Chinese music. His soundtrack work draws on a variety of sources as well, although he has commented that "very few (of the soundtracks) have a distinct Jakko stamp (whatever that may be)."

Personal life
Jakszyk is divorced from model Amanda Giles, the daughter of King Crimson drummer and co-founder Michael Giles. They have two children who he currently lives with in Hertfordshire.

Discography

Singles and EPs

Albums

As guest or sideman
 David Jackson: The Long Hello Vol. 3 (Butt Records, 1982) – guitars, bass guitar, synthesizer, vocals
 Peter Blegvad: The Naked Shakespeare (Virgin, 1983 – guitar
 Neil: Neil's Heavy Concept Album (WEA, 1984)
 Peter Blegvad: Knights Like These (Virgin, 1985) – guitar
 What If: What If (RCA, 1987) – guitar
 Swing Out Sister: It's Better to Travel (Mercury, 1987) – guitar
 Peter Blegvad: Downtime (Virgin, 1988) – guitar, backing vocals
 Sam Brown: Stop! (Mercury, 1988) – guitar
 John Greaves, David Cunningham: Greaves, Cunningham (Eva Records, 1991) (reissued on Piano 1997) – vocals
 Mica Paris: Whisper a Prayer (4th & Broadway, 1993) – guitar
 Holi (Akiko Kobayashi): Under the Monkey Puzzle Tree (Resurgence, 1994) – guitar, flute, backing vocals
 Peter Blegvad with John Greaves and Chris Cutler: Just Woke Up (ReR Megacorp, 1995) – guitars
 Mick Karn: The Tooth Mother (CMP, 1996) – guitars, shawm, dilruba, flute, tenor saxophone, keyboards, programming, sampler
 Indigo Falls: Indigo Falls (Medium Productions, 1997) – guitars and low whistle
 Saro Cosentino: Ones and Zeros (Consorzio Produttori Indipendenti/Mercury/Resurgence, 1997) – vocals
 Gavin Harrison: Sanity and Gravity (Resurgence, 1997) – keyboards, guitar, vocals, whistle
 Pip Pyle: 7 Year Itch (Voiceprint, 1998) – guitar, flute, production, lead vocals on three tracks
 Mark King:  Mark King Group Live ... At The Jazz Café (Mark King Self-released, 1999) – guitar, backing vocals
 Steven Wilson: The Raven That Refused to Sing (And Other Stories) (Kscope, 2013) – vocals on "Luminol" and "The Watchmaker"
 Fjieri: "Words Are All We Have" (Emerald, 2015) – lead and backing vocals on 9 tracks, guitar
 Steve Hackett: "Genesis Revisited" (Inside Out Music, 2012) – lead vocals on "Entangled", guitar
 Level 42 : Live at London's Town and Country Club – Recorded in 1992 – (DVD, Wienerworld, 2013) – Guitar and backing vocals
 Louise Patricia Crane: "Deep Blue" (Peculiar Doll Records, 2020) – Guitar and backing vocals

Album remixes

TV and video
 Jo Brand's "Through the Cakehole"
 Chef (BBC – music for all series)
 Hard Cases (Central TV)
 Clive James's Postcard from... Bombay
 In Dreams (BBC TV movie)
 Birds of a Feather (BBC – music for one season and a Christmas special)
 CD-ROM games World War II and The War in the Pacific.

References

External links
 
 Jakko M. Jakszyk @ MySpace
 Previous official homepage – old front page

1958 births
Living people
English adoptees
English people of American descent
English people of Irish descent
Musicians from London
People from Croxley Green
English funk musicians
English jazz musicians
English pop musicians
English rock musicians
English session musicians
Discipline Global Mobile artists
King Crimson members
Level 42 members
National Youth Theatre members
The Tangent members
21st Century Schizoid Band members
Chiswick Records artists